Anthony Christopher "Chris" Shevlane (6 May 1942 – 13 March 2023) was a Scottish footballer who played as a right-back for Hearts, Celtic, Hibernian and Greenock Morton.

After playing for Edina Hearts and Loanhead Mayflower, Shevlane started his professional career with Hearts. He made his competitive debut in April 1963 and earned international recognition with the Scotland under-23 team and the Scottish League XI. An ankle injury meant that Shevlane missed most of the 1966–67 season, and he was released by Hearts at the end of that season. He then signed for Celtic, but was unable to displace first-choice right-back Jim Craig and made just two league appearances for the club.

In 1968 Shevlane moved to Hibernian and he helped them reach the 1968–69 Scottish League Cup final, which they lost 6–2 to his previous club Celtic. He later played for Greenock Morton before his retirement from playing. 

Shevlane later worked for a booksellers, and also ran Shevlane’s Bar in the Springburn area of Glasgow. He died on 13 March 2023, at the age of 80.

References

External links
Hibernian player Chris Shevlane, FitbaStats
Hearts player Chris Shevlane, London Hearts Supporters Club

1942 births
2023 deaths
Scottish footballers
Footballers from Edinburgh
Association football fullbacks
Scottish Football League players
Scottish Football League representative players
Scotland under-23 international footballers
Heart of Midlothian F.C. players
Celtic F.C. players
Hibernian F.C. players
Greenock Morton F.C. players